The 1892–93 Football Tournament was the 4th staging of The Football Tournament.

The format was slightly unusual in that all games had to have a winner. Therefore, if the match was level after 90 minutes, extra time was played. If the match was still level after extra-time, the match was replayed until a winner emerged.

Overview
It was contested by 5 teams, and Akademisk Boldklub won the championship.

League standings

References

External links
RSSSF

1892–93 in Danish football
Top level Danish football league seasons
The Football Tournament seasons
Denmark